WVBT (channel 43) is a television station licensed to Virginia Beach, Virginia, United States, serving the Hampton Roads area as an affiliate of the Fox network. It is owned by Nexstar Media Group alongside Portsmouth-licensed NBC affiliate WAVY-TV (channel 10). Both stations share studios on Wavy Street in downtown Portsmouth, while WVBT's transmitter is located in Suffolk, Virginia.

WVBT's programming is also seen on Class A repeaters WNLO-CD (channel 14) in Norfolk and WPMC-CD (channel 36) in Mappsville.

History
WVBT began operation on March 22, 1993, with Home Shopping Network programming along with infomercials and religious shows. It became a charter affiliate of The WB starting on January 11, 1995. Shortly thereafter, the station's original local owners signed a local marketing agreement (LMA) with LIN TV. Under that agreement, WAVY took over the station's operations, and WVBT moved to WAVY's studios in Portsmouth. In May 1996, WVBT began broadcasting from a new transmitter, giving it a coverage area comparable to the other major Hampton Roads stations. Before then, its over-the-air signal was effectively limited to Virginia Beach and parts of Norfolk.

LIN TV reached an affiliation agreement with Fox in November 1995, and outright purchased the station in 2002. Due to an affiliation deal between The WB and WTVZ's (channel 33) owner, Sinclair Broadcast Group, WTVZ swapped affiliations with WVBT in August 1998. The final WB program to air on WVBT was a repeat episode of The Steve Harvey Show, "Fool and the Gang" on July 29, 1998; almost three days later, the first Fox program to air on WVBT was Fox News Sunday.

Until January 2007, WAVY operated a 24-hour local weather channel called "WAVY Weather Station" on WVBT's second digital subchannel taking advantage of its 720p signal to present the service without interfering with video quality on either WAVY or WVBT. It was made cable-only in 2007 for unknown reasons, and eventually went dark in 2011. It was seen on Mediacom channel 9, Charter channel 22, and Cox digital channel 227. There were live current conditions, updated forecasts, and a live feed of "Super Doppler 10".

On March 21, 2014, Richmond-based Media General announced that it would buy LIN Media for $1.6 billion in cash and stock. The merger was completed on December 19, at which point WAVY and WVBT came under common ownership with ABC affiliate WRIC-TV in Petersburg (serving the Richmond market).

On January 27, 2016, Media General signed an agreement to have its assets acquired by Irving, Texas-based Nexstar Broadcasting Group for $4.6 billion, plus the assumption of $2.3 billion in Media General-held debt. The agreement followed Media General's termination of an earlier sale agreement with Des Moines–based Meredith Corporation, which received the right of first refusal to acquire any broadcast or digital properties that may be divested (a clause that Meredith did not exercise) in exchange for terminating its agreement with Media General for $60 million. The transaction was approved by the FCC on January 11, 2017; the sale was completed on January 17, at which point the existing Nexstar stations and the former Media General outlets that neither group had to sell in order to rectify ownership conflicts in certain markets became part of the renamed Nexstar Media Group; this brought WAVY-TV and WVBT under common ownership with the Roanoke duopoly of Fox affiliate WFXR and CW affiliate WWCW (which necessitated Media General to sell its NBC-affiliated station in that market, WSLS-TV, to Graham Media Group in order to alleviate said ownership conflict with the two existing Nexstar-owned stations).

On December 3, 2018, Nexstar announced it would acquire the assets of Chicago-based Tribune Media—which has operated CBS affiliate WTKR (channel 3) and CW affiliate WGNT (channel 27) through a shared services agreement with partner company Dreamcatcher Broadcasting since December 2013—for $6.4 billion in cash and debt. Nexstar was precluded from acquiring WTKR/WGNT directly or indirectly while owning WAVY/WVBT, as FCC regulations prohibit common ownership of more than two stations in the same media market, or two or more of the four highest-rated stations in the market. (WAVY and WTKR consistently rank among the top four in terms of total-day viewership in the Norfolk–Virginia Beach–Hampton Roads market, while WVBT and WGNT have occasionally rotated between fourth and fifth place, a situation that allowed for Media General and, later, Nexstar to acquire WVBT directly in their respective group acquisitions involving the WAVY/WVBT duopoly. Furthermore, any attempt by Nexstar to assume the operations of WTKR/WGNT through local marketing or shared services agreements would have been subject to regulatory hurdles that could have delayed completion of the FCC and Justice Department's review and approval process for the acquisition.) As such, on January 31, 2019, Nexstar announced it would retain the WAVY/WVBT duopoly and sell WTKR and WGNT to a different buyer; it was announced on March 20, 2019, that the WTKR/WGNT duopoly would be sold to the E. W. Scripps Company.

Newscasts

When WVBT made the switch to Fox in 1998, WAVY started producing a nightly prime time newscast on this station called Fox 43 News at 10. It was not the market's first broadcast in the time slot as WTKR produced a short-lived show on WGNT from 1995 until 1997. ABC affiliate WVEC-TV aired its own prime time broadcast on low-powered WPEN-LP from 1995 until it started cable-only LNC 4 (eventually renamed LNC 5) in 1997. WVEC continued to produce a 10 o'clock show on the cable channel until January 30, 2009.

WVBT's news has been very successful over the years with consistent viewership and ratings and is the only offering of late, local news an hour earlier. The nightly 45 minute broadcast is followed by the Fox 43 Sports Wrap that airs for fifteen minutes featuring sports news and highlights. It is similar in format to a highlight program currently seen weeknights on sister station WNAC-TV. On July 21, 2008, the station's newscast and sports show started to be produced in high definition after WAVY made the upgrade.

On February 2, 2009, WVBT added Fox 43 News at 7 on weekday mornings with local news, weather, and traffic updates along with various entertainment/lifestyle features. This morning show (which was essentially an hour-long extension of WAVY's morning broadcast) ended January 8, 2010. The program was then replaced by The Hampton Roads Show which launched January 18, 2010 from a new secondary set complete with a fully functional kitchen. The Hampton Roads Show moved to WAVY at 11 in the morning on September 12, 2011. It is a similar broadcast to one currently seen on sister station WPRI-TV called The Rhode Show.

In 2012, WVBT aired The Daily Buzz on weekdays from 6:00-7:00 and again from 8:00-9:00 a.m. Sandwiched in between those 2 hours, is the revised program of WAVY News 10 at 7:00 on FOX 43, which was originally cancelled back in 2010. As of 2013, The Daily Buzz no longer airs on WVBT and the morning newscast became a two-hour show. On October 28, 2013, WVBT's 10:00 newscast was renamed WAVY News 10 at 10 on FOX 43.

Technical information

Subchannels
The station's digital signal is multiplexed:

On March 5, 2018, WVBT added Cozi TV on digital subchannel 43.2. Previously, WVBT was the only station in Hampton Roads that did not have a digital subchannel.

Analog-to-digital conversion
WVBT discontinued regular programming on its analog signal, over UHF channel 43, at 9 a.m. on June 12, 2009, as part of the federally mandated transition from analog to digital television. The station's digital signal remained on its pre-transition UHF channel 29, using PSIP to display WVBT's virtual channel as 43 on digital television receivers.

What is now WNLO-CD began as W45BG (call sign assigned November 1993) becoming WNLO-LP in November 2000 and WNLO-CA in January 2002. It went all-digital in January 2005 making it one of the first low-power stations in the country to begin digital broadcasting. Its calls became the current WNLO-CD ("CD" for "Class A Digital") in July 2009. This should not be confused with its CW sister station in Buffalo, New York that uses the same call letters in full-power form. The station could have used the calls WVBT-CA for the repeater (as most of these situations in other markets do) but likely decided against it to avert any confusion to viewers, due to the mere two-channel separation between channels 43 and 45. The confusion was made moot in the digital age when the PSIP standard allowed WNLO-CD to utilize WVBT's virtual channel 43 instead, and WNLO-CD moved to physical channel 14 at the same time WVBT moved their physical channel in 2020 as part of the FCC's spectrum re-allocation.

ATSC 3.0 lighthouse

On November 20, 2020, WNLO-CD switched over to ATSC 3.0, simulcasts from WAVY, WTVZ and WVBT.

Translators
WVBT is rebroadcast on two low-powered class A translators. While one translator (WNLO-CD) is licensed in Norfolk with its digital transmitter located in Driver, Virginia the other one (WPMC-CD) is licensed in Mappsville with its transmitter located in Bloxom, Virginia in Accomack County, which is in the Eastern Shore of Virginia. Both class A translators are owned and operated by Nexstar.

 WPMC-CD  Channel 36 Mappsville
 WNLO-CD  Channel 14 Norfolk

References

External links
FOX43 TV
WAVY-TV

VBT
Fox network affiliates
Cozi TV affiliates
Rewind TV affiliates
Television channels and stations established in 1993
1993 establishments in Virginia
Nexstar Media Group
Mass media in Virginia Beach, Virginia